Al-Budi (also spelled el-Bodi) is a village in northwestern Syria, administratively part of the Jableh District in the Latakia Governorate, located south of Latakia. Nearby localities include Ayn al-Shiqaq to the west, Qardaha to the north, Harf al-Musaytirah to the east, Zama and Ayn al-Sharqiyah to the south and Siyano to the southwest. According to the Syria Central Bureau of Statistics, al-Budi had a population of 2,359 in the 2004 census. The inhabitants are predominantly Alawites.

References

Populated places in Jableh District
Alawite communities in Syria